The R524 is a Regional Route in South Africa.

Route
It is an east–west route, and its westernmost point is a junction with N1 at Louis Trichardt. From there it runs to Thohoyandou, where the R523's eastern end forms a junction with it. After leaving Thoyandou it runs east, where it intersects with the northern end of the R81 at Malamulele. From that point it heads more north-easterly and terminates at the Punda Maria Gate of Kruger National Park.

References

Regional Routes in Limpopo